The 1990 Big Eight men's basketball tournament was held March 9–11 at Kemper Arena in Kansas City, Missouri.

Second-seeded Oklahoma defeated #8 seed  in the championship game, 92–80, to earn the conference's automatic bid to the 1990 NCAA tournament.

Bracket

References

Tournament
Big Eight Conference men's basketball tournament
Big Eight Conference men's basketball tournament
Big Eight Conference men's basketball tournament